Alexandre Obambot (born 14 February 1999) is a Congolese football defender.

References

1999 births
Living people
Republic of the Congo footballers
Republic of the Congo international footballers
CARA Brazzaville players
FK Spartaks Jūrmala players
Saint-Pryvé Saint-Hilaire FC players
Association football defenders
Republic of the Congo expatriate footballers
Expatriate footballers in France
Republic of the Congo expatriate sportspeople in France
Expatriate footballers in Latvia
Republic of the Congo expatriate sportspeople in Latvia